The Three Degrees is a 1973 studio album released by girl group The Three Degrees.
Since their formation in 1965 until 1969, The Three Degrees had released several hit singles on various labels, including Swan Records, Warner Bros. Records, Metromedia, and Neptune. Their first studio album, entitled "Maybe" was released on Roulette Records in 1970 as were several other singles on the same label.

This was the first studio album recorded by the Group for Philadelphia International Records and was produced by Kenny Gamble and Leon Huff. Released in 1973, the album includes three hit singles, "Dirty Ol' Man", a #1 hit single in the Netherlands, "Year of Decision" and the UK #1, "When Will I See You Again". The album charted at #11 on the UK album chart.

The album was re-issued on CD in 2010, for the first time in the UK, by Big Break Records. This re-issue includes three bonus tracks including a 1977 remix of "Dirty Ol' Man" by Tom Moulton.

Track listing

Personnel
The Three Degrees
 Sheila Ferguson – vocals
 Valerie Holiday – vocals
 Fayette Pinkney – vocals
with:
MFSB – music
Bobby Martin, Lenny Pakula, Norman Harris, Richie Rome – arrangements
Technical
Joe Tarsia – recording engineer
Owen Brown – photography

Charts

Singles

References

External links
 The Three Degrees-The Three Degrees at Discogs

1973 albums
The Three Degrees albums
Albums produced by Kenneth Gamble
Albums produced by Leon Huff
Albums arranged by Bobby Martin
Albums recorded at Sigma Sound Studios
Philadelphia International Records albums